Lauckport is an unincorporated community in Wood County, West Virginia, United States.

The community most likely derives its name from the local Lauck family.

References 

Unincorporated communities in West Virginia
Unincorporated communities in Wood County, West Virginia